Clara Zetkin (5 July 1857 – 20 June 1933) was a German Marxist theorist, activist, and advocate for women's rights. In 1911, she organized the first International Women's Day.

This is a Clara Zetkin bibliography, including writings, speeches, letters and others.

Writings 

This is a list of selected writings:

Speeches

See also 

 Marxist bibliography

References

External links 

 Clara Zetkin at the Marxists Internet Archive

 
Zetkin, Clara
Communist books